Nat Baldwin (born February 21, 1980 in Rochester, New Hampshire) is an American bassist, improvisor, and songwriter. He's released several solo albums since 2003 and is also known for being a former member of Dirty Projectors. In 2020 he released a series of experimental works for solo double bass: AUTONOMIA I: Body Without Organs, AUTONOMIA II: Recombinations, and AUTONOMIA III: Endnotes. The last album featuring his songwriting is In the Hollows. He has appeared on many albums such as In Ear Park (2008) by Department of Eagles, Contra (2010) by Vampire Weekend and Shields (2012) by Grizzly Bear.

Solo discography
Solo Contrabass (2003)
Lights Out (2005)
Enter the Winter (2006)
Most Valuable Player (2007)
People Changes (2011)
In the Hollows (2014)
AUTONOMIA I: Body Without Organs (2020)
AUTONOMIA II: Recombinations (2020)
AUTONOMIA III: Endnotes (2020)

References

External links
Nat Baldwin on Allmusic

Experimental musicians
American rock bass guitarists
1980 births
Living people
Dirty Projectors members
21st-century American bass guitarists
Western Vinyl artists